The Chamber of Deputies is the lower house of the Parliament of Equatorial Guinea.

Although vested with considerable powers under the country's constitution, the Chamber has been dominated by the Democratic Party of Equatorial Guinea since its establishment, and there is virtually no opposition to executive decisions. Indeed, there have never been more than eight opposition legislators in the body.

Prior to 2013, the Chamber was a unicameral legislature and was named the Chamber of People's Representatives.

Electoral system
The 100 members of the Chamber are elected by closed-list proportional representation in multi-member constituencies. Members serve five-year terms.

Presidents of the Chamber of Deputies

Last elections

See also
List of legislatures by country
Legislative branch

References

Government of Equatorial Guinea
Politics of Equatorial Guinea
Equatorial Guinea
1968 establishments in Equatorial Guinea